Diether de la Motte (30 March 1928 – 15 May 2010) was a German musician, composer, music theorist, music critic and academic teacher.

Life 
From 1950 to 1959 he was a lecturer for composition, theory of form and piano at the Düsseldorf Kirchenmusikschule. From 1955, he wrote music reviews for the Rheinische Post. From 1959 to 1962, he worked as an editor at Schott Musikverlag in Mainz. He took courses at Darmstädter Ferienkurse, with Ernst Krenek, among others.

From 1962, de la Motte taught composition and music theory at the Musikhochschule Hamburg and was appointed a professor there in 1964. In 1972, he became president of the Akademie der Künste in Berlin. In 1982 he was appointed professor at the Musikhochschule Hannover. In 1988, he accepted a call as professor of music theory, a new chair at the Wiener Musikakademie, where he taught until 1996.

De la Motte was married to Helga de la Motte-Haber. They lived in Vienna until 2006 when they moved back to Berlin. He died there at the age of 82.

Work 
The compositional output of de la Motte encompasses almost all genres and ranges, from traditional forms such as stage work, orchestral, vocal and chamber music to experimental events, performances and pieces with ground-breaking ideas. He wrote an opera so oder so (Like This or That), five scenic variations to his own libretto, which was first performed at the Hamburg State Opera on 10 April 1975.

Besides his compositional work, de la Motte is widely known as a music theorist. His writings belong to the standard literature for students of music and musicology. He wrote fundamental books on musical analysis, counterpoint and harmony. His archive is held by the Akademie der Künste, containing autographs and prints of both compositions and written publications such as monographies, essays and lectures, his correspondence with Gottfried von Einem, Wolfgang Fortner, Hans Werner Henze, Friederike Mayröcker and Bernd Alois Zimmermann, concert programs, reviews and photographies.

Publications 
 Hans Werner Henze. Der Prinz von Homburg. Schott, Mainz 1960
 Harmonielehre. Bärenreiter-Verlag Karl Vötterle, Kassel/Basel/Tours/London, und Deutscher Taschenbuch Verlag, Munich 1976; additional editions: Deutscher Verlag für Musik, Wiesbaden 1977, Deutscher Taschenbuch Verlag, Munich 2004, .
 Musikalische Analyse. Textteil u. Notenteil. 2 volumes. Bärenreiter, Kassel 1978, .
 Kontrapunkt. Ein Lese- und Arbeitsbuch. Bärenreiter, Munich 1981 u. dtv, Munich 2002, .
 Musik bewegt sich im Raum. 16 Konzepte für Laien-Professionals aus Musik, Sprache, Sprachmusik und Bewegung. Moeck, Celle 1987, .
 Melodie. Ein Lese- und Arbeitsbuch. dtv, Munich 1993, .
 Musik Formen. Phantasie, Einfall, Originalität. Wißner, Augsburg 1999, .
 Wege zum Komponieren. Ermutigung und Hilfestellung. Bärenreiter, Kassel 2001, .
 Gedichte sind Musik. Musikalische Analysen von Gedichten aus 800 Jahren.  Bärenreiter, Kassel 2002, .

References

External links 
 
 
 Harmonielehre (in German) kholopov.ru
 
 Motte, Diether de la operone.de

German male composers
German music theorists
German music critics
Literary editors
Hochschule für Musik Detmold alumni
Academic staff of the University of Music and Performing Arts Vienna
Academic staff of the Hochschule für Musik, Theater und Medien Hannover
1928 births
2010 deaths
Musicians from Bonn